Debbie Lawler (born December 13, 1952) is an American motorcyclist. Lawler is most noted as the first female motorcyclist to beat Evel Knievel's record.

Early life and career beginnings 
Lawler was born in Grants Pass, Oregon. Her veteran motorcycle racer father Ben Lawler gave her a motorcycle for her 10th birthday in 1962. Lawler started to begin jumping at fairs and speedways in 1972. In  February, 1974, Lawler beat Evel Knievel's indoor record where she jumped 101 feet, being the first woman to set such a record. The next month Lawler crash landed at Ontario Motor Speedway where she jumped 146 feet. The bike that Lawler used was Suzuki TM250.  Lawler was known to never jump without her orange bra. Lawler was called America's stunt sweetheart, flying angel, and the female Evel Knievel. Evel Knievel gave her a pink mink coat after he reclaimed back his title . After her crash landing from her jump in 1974, Lawler retired from jumping.

References

1952 births
Living people
American motorcycle racers
Motorcycle stunt performers
Women stunt performers
American stunt performers
People from Grants Pass, Oregon